Rosita is a town and a municipality in the North Caribbean Autonomous Region of Nicaragua.

The town has a population of 15,801 (2021 estimate). Rosita is also sometimes called La Rosita.

External links
Pictorial History of Rosita - to view more photos of Rosita mine and town between 1956 and 1961, go to this address to see Siuna area photos including Rosita area:  https://web.archive.org/web/20100117035333/http://picasaweb.google.com/JimDrebert/SiunaNicaragua1955To1961

References 

Municipalities of the North Caribbean Coast Autonomous Region